David Kiprotich Bett (born 18 October 1992) is a Kenyan long-distance runner, who specialises in the 5000 meters and road racing. Top finishes include winning the 2019 B.A.A. 10K and 2022 Cooper River Bridge Run 10K, and in 2022 finished 3rd at the prestigious Falmouth Road Race and 4th at Bloomsday 12km. He is under management with International Elite T. C.

At the 2010 World Junior Championships in Athletics in Moncton, Canada, Bett won a gold medal over 5000 m.

At the 2009 World Youth Championships in Athletics in Brixen, Italy, Bett won a silver medal over 3000 m.

Personal best

References

External links

1992 births
Living people
People from Narok County
Kenyan male long-distance runners
Athletes (track and field) at the 2018 Commonwealth Games
Commonwealth Games competitors for Kenya
20th-century Kenyan people
21st-century Kenyan people